The 1953 population census in Bosnia and Herzegovina was the second population census of the Socialist Federal Republic of Yugoslavia took place on March 31, 1953. The administrative organization of Bosnia and Herzegovina (51.221 km²) was identical to the first census in the socialist Yugoslavia (1948), apart from the fact that the Odžak district had been abolished and merged with the district of Modriča. The option to identify oneself as ethnic Muslim or ethnic Bosniak was still absent in 1953.

Results

 The number of inhabitants: 2,847,459
 Population density: 55.6 per km²

Overall

See also

1991 population census in Bosnia and Herzegovina

References 

Population Census In Bosnia And Herzegovina, 1953
Population
Censuses in Bosnia and Herzegovina
Bosnia